Patrick Regan (born 1852, date of death unknown) was a United States Navy sailor and a recipient of the United States military's highest decoration, the Medal of Honor.

Biography
Born in 1852 in Cobh (then known as Queenstown), Ireland, Regan immigrated to the United States and was living in New York City when he joined the U.S. Navy.

On the morning of 30 July 1873, Pensacola was in the harbor of Coquimbo, Chile, when a northerly gale began. During the high winds, one of Regan's crewmates, Ordinary Seaman Peter Linguist, fell into the water while trying to re-board the ship from a small boat. When he resurfaced, his head struck the boat and he was knocked unconscious. Wearing heavy clothing and boots, Linguist quickly began to sink. Regan witnessed the event from the ship's gun deck and, when he realized the sailor was drowning, jumped through a porthole and rescued him. Pensacola's captain, John H. Upshur, sent word of Regan's act to his superiors that very day, and Regan was notified two months later, on 6 October, that he would be awarded the Medal of Honor.

Regan's official Medal of Honor citation reads:
Serving on board the U.S.S. Pensacola, Regan displayed gallant conduct in the harbor of Coquimbo, Chile, 30 July 1873.

See also

List of Medal of Honor recipients during peacetime

References

1852 births
19th-century Irish people
Irish sailors in the United States Navy
Year of death missing
People from County Cork
Military personnel from New York City
Irish emigrants to the United States (before 1923)
United States Navy sailors
United States Navy Medal of Honor recipients
Irish-born Medal of Honor recipients
Non-combat recipients of the Medal of Honor